Isaac ben Solomon Luria Ashkenazi (1534 – July 25, 1572) ( Yitzhak Ben Sh'lomo Lurya Ashkenazi), commonly known in Jewish religious circles as "Ha'ARI" (meaning "The Lion"), "Ha'ARI Hakadosh" (the holy ARI) or "ARIZaL" (the ARI of Blessed Memory (Zikhrono Livrakha)), was a leading rabbi and Jewish mystic in the community of Safed in the Galilee region of Ottoman Syria, now Israel. He is considered the father of contemporary Kabbalah, his teachings being referred to as Lurianic Kabbalah. He is sometimes known as the Ari in English.

While his direct literary contribution to the Kabbalistic school of Safed was extremely minute (he wrote only a few poems), his spiritual fame led to their veneration and the acceptance of his authority. The works of his disciples compiled his oral teachings into writing. Every custom of Luria was scrutinized, and many were accepted, even against previous practice.

Luria died at Safed, Damascus Eyalet on July 25, 1572, and is buried at the Old Jewish Cemetery, Safed. The Ari Ashkenazi Synagogue, also located in Safed was built in memory of Luria during the late 16th century.

Early life 

Luria was born in 1534 in Jerusalem in what is now the Old Yishuv Court Museum to an Ashkenazi father, Solomon, and a Sephardic mother.

Sefer HaKavanot U'Ma'aseh Nissim records that one day Luria's father remained in the Beth kneset alone, studying, when Eliyahu HaNavi (Elijah) appeared to him and said, "I have been sent to you by the Almighty to bring you tidings that your holy wife shall conceive and bear a child, and that you must call him Yitzchak. He shall begin to deliver the believers from the Klipot [husks, forces of evil]. Through him, numerous souls will receive their tikkun. He is also destined to reveal many hidden mysteries in the Torah and to expound on the Zohar. His fame will spread throughout the world. Take care therefore that you not circumcise him before I come to be the Sandak [who holds the child during the Brit Milah ceremony]."

While still a child, Luria lost his father, and was brought up by his rich maternal uncle Mordechai Frances, a tax-farmer from Cairo, Egypt. His uncle placed him under the best Jewish teachers, including the leading rabbinic scholar David ibn Zimra. Luria showed himself a diligent student of rabbinical literature and under the guidance of another uncle, Rabbi Bezalel Ashkenazi (best known as the author of Shittah Mekubetzet), he became proficient in that branch of Jewish learning.

At the age of fifteen, he married a cousin, the daughter of Mordechai Frances and, being amply provided for financially, he was able to continue his studies. Around the age of twenty-two he became engrossed in the study of the Zohar (a major work of the Kabbalah that had recently been printed for the first time) and adopted the life of a recluse. Retreating to the banks of the Nile for seven years, he secluded himself in an isolated cottage, giving himself up entirely to meditation. He visited his family only on Shabbat. But even at home, he would not utter a word, even to his wife. When it was necessary for him to say something, he would say it in the fewest words possible, and then, only in Hebrew.

Teachings

In 1569, Luria moved back to Eretz Israel; and after a short sojourn in Jerusalem, where his new kabbalistic system seemed to have met with little success, he settled in Safed. Safed over the previous decades had become a center for kabbalistic studies, led by Rabbi Moses Cordovero. There is evidence that Luria also regarded Cordovero as his teacher. Joseph Sambari (1640–1703), an Egyptian chronicler, testified that Cordovero was "the Ari's teacher for a very short time." Luria probably arrived in early 1570, and Cordovero died on June 27 that year (the 23d day of Tammuz). Bereft of their most prominent authority and teacher, the community looked for new guidance, and Luria helped fill Cordovero's former role.

Soon Luria had two classes of disciples: novices, to whom he expounded the elementary Kabbalah, and initiates, who became the repositories of his secret teachings and his formulas of invocation and conjuration. The most renowned of the initiates was Rabbi Hayyim Vital, who, according to his master, possessed a soul which had not been soiled by Adam's sin. With him Luria visited the grave of Rabbi Shimon bar Yochai and those of other eminent teachers; it is said that these graves were unmarked (the identity of each grave was unknown), but through the guidance given by Elijah each grave was recognized. Luria's kabbalistic circle gradually widened and became a separate congregation, in which his mystic doctrines were supreme, influencing all the religious ceremonies. On Shabbat, Luria dressed himself in white and wore a fourfold garment to signify the four letters of the Ineffable Name.

Many Jews who had been exiled from Spain following the Edict of Expulsion believed they were in the time of trial that would precede the appearance of the Messiah in Galilee. Those who moved to Ottoman Syria in anticipation of this event found a great deal of comfort in Luria's teachings, due to his theme of exile. Although he did not write down his teachings, they were published by his followers and by 1650 his ideas were known by Jews throughout Europe.

Luria delivered his lectures spontaneously, without ever writing down his ideas (with a few exceptions, including kabbalistic poems in Aramaic for the Shabbat table). The foremost advocate of his kabbalistic system was Rabbi Hayyim Vital, who collected all the disciples' lecture notes. Numerous works were produced from these notes, the most important of which was the Etz Chaim, ("Tree of Life"), in eight volumes (see below). Originally, it circulated only in manuscript copies. Each of Luria's disciples had to pledge—under pain of excommunication—not to allow any copy be made for a foreign country, so that for a time all the manuscripts remained in Ottoman Syria. Eventually, one was brought to Europe and was published at Zolkiev in 1772 by Isaac Satanow. In this work, both the theoretical and the devotional-meditative teachings of Lurianic Kabbalah, based on the Zohar, are elaborated upon.

Tzimtzum was one of Luria's most important ideas that he stressed in his lectures.

Burial place
He is buried in Old Cemetery of Tzfat / Safed.

Other notable rabbis also buried in Old Cemetery of Tzfat / Safed:
 Alshich HaKadosh
 Shlomo Halevi Alkabetz
 Moses ben Jacob Cordovero
 Joseph Karo

Disciples 
 Hayyim Vital
 Israel Sarug
 Samuel ben Isaac de Uçeda

Notes

References

External links 

 Shaarei Kedushah - Gates of Holiness in English
 Orthodox Union page on Rabbi Isaac Luria – The Ari
 Short biography of Rabbi Isaac Luria – The Ari Hakodosh
 Video lecture on Rabbi Isaac Luria by Dr. Henry Abramson
 Letter, written and signed by Isaac Luria, from the Cairo Genizah
 Traditional Sphardi Singing of Luria's Yom Zeh L'Yisrael
 Centre for Lurian Kabbalah
 

 
1534 births
1572 deaths
16th-century rabbis from the Ottoman Empire
16th-century Jewish theologians
Ashkenazi Jews from the Ottoman Empire
Kabbalists
Rabbis in Ottoman Galilee
Rabbis in Safed
Burials at the Old Jewish Cemetery, Safed
Sephardi Jews from the Ottoman Empire